is the third studio album by Japanese singer-songwriter Miyuki Nakajima, released in June 1977. The album features "On the Platform", a song later released as B-side of her breakthrough single "The Parting Song (Wakareuta)" .

Track listing
All songs written and composed by Miyuki Nakajima.

Side one
All tracks arranged by Shun Fukui and Kinji Yoshino (except for arrangement of "Henro" by Yoshino, "Matsuribayashi" by Fukui)
"" - 5:03
"" - 5:47
"" - 4:02
"" - 5:13

Side two
All tracks arranged by Shun Fukui and Kinji Yoshino (except for arrangement of "Katte ni Shiyagare" and "Toki wa Nagarete" by Yoshino, "On the Platform" by Fukui)
"" - 3:42
"" - 4:50
"" - 3:02
"" - 4:24
"" - 7:07

Personnel
Miyuki Nakajima - vocal, acoustic guitar
Ryuichi Sakamoto - keyboards
Ken Yoshida - bass guitar
Kiyoshi Sugimoto - guitars
Masao Komatsuzaki - drums
Shinji Hagiwara - drums
Naomi Kawahara - drums
Teruo Sato - drums
Masaki Nomura - drums

Production
Recording director; Yoshio Okushima
Assistant engineer; Koji Sakakibara
Manager; Kunio Kaneko
Director; Yūzō Watanabe
Cover designer; Natsuo Ueda
Photographer; Jin Tamura
Executive producer; Genichi Kawakami

Chart position

References

Miyuki Nakajima albums
1977 albums
Pony Canyon albums